Acheilognathus omeiensis is a species of ray-finned fish in the genus Acheilognathus. It is endemic to China.

References

Acheilognathus
Taxa named by Tchang Tchung-Lin
Fish described in 1934
Freshwater fish of China